The special law to redeem pro-Japanese collaborators' property (Hanja: 親日反民族行為者財產의國家歸屬에關한特別法, literally "Special Law for the Nationalization of Pro-Japanese Race Traitors' Assets")  is a special South Korean law that passed the South Korean National Assembly on December 8, 2005, and was enacted on December 29, 2005. Under this law, the South Korean government is able to seize land and other properties owned by Korean collaborators (chinilpa), and their descendants, who supported the Japanese administration during the period between 1905 and 1945. The bill defines as collaborators people who took part in Japan’s annexation of Korea in 1910, received titles from the Japanese colonial government, or served as parliamentarians in Japanese Korea. The confiscated assets are allegedly used to compensate pro-independence activists and their offspring.

See also 
 Roh Moo-hyun
 Uri Party

References

External links
Investigative Commission on Pro-Japanese Collaborators' Property

Anti-Japanese sentiment in South Korea

Liberalism in South Korea
Postcolonialism
Roh Moo-hyun
Social liberalism
Law of South Korea